Lance Kramer is an animation director on The Simpsons and Futurama.  He was as an additional sequence director for The Simpsons Movie.  He also worked as an assistant animator on Tom and Jerry: The Movie and served as a storyboard artist for Garfield and Friends.

History
Kramer graduated from Bismarck High School in Bismarck, North Dakota. He graduated from San Diego State University with a degree in film production.

The Simpsons episodes
Kramer directed the following episodes:

Season 11
"Saddlesore Galactica"

Season 12
"Skinner's Sense of Snow"

Season 13
"A Hunka Hunka Burns in Love"
"The Old Man and the Key"

Season 14
"Mr. Spritz Goes to Washington"

Season 16
"Goo Goo Gai Pan"

Season 18
"The Wife Aquatic"
"Crook and Ladder"

Season 19
"Little Orphan Millie"
"Smoke on the Daughter"

Season 20
"Sex, Pies and Idiot Scrapes"
"How the Test Was Won"

Season 21
"Homer the Whopper"
"The Squirt and the Whale"

Season 22
"The Real Housewives of Fat Tony"

Season 23
"How I Wet Your Mother"

Season 25
"Specs and the City"

Season 26
"Bull-E"

Season 28
"Friends and Family"
"The Caper Chase"

Season 29
"Left Behind"

Season 30
'Tis the 30th Season"

Season 32
"Burger Kings"

Futurama episodes
Kramer directed the following episodes:

Season 7
"Leela and the Genestalk"
"Near-Death Wish"
"T.: The Terrestrial"

Kramer directed "Denny Goes Air-Surfing", a two-minute short subject which aired as part of Spike and Mike's 1991 Festival of Animation.  In it, a young dragon named Denny decides to air-surf on a 747, to the accompaniment of Joe Satriani's instrumental rock song "Surfing with the Alien". His other works can also be found on the web at deviantart.com and on his blog at airsurfing.blogspot.com.

External links
Lance Kramer's Official website
 

Year of birth missing (living people)
Living people
American animators
American storyboard artists
People from Bismarck, North Dakota
San Diego State University alumni
American animated film directors
American television directors